Neurological Sciences is a bimonthly peer-reviewed medical journal covering neurology. It was established in 1979 as the Italian Journal of Neurological Sciences, obtaining its current name in 2000. The editor-in-chief is Fabrizio Tagliavini (Carlo Besta Neurological Institute). According to the Journal Citation Reports, the journal has a 2020 impact factor of 3.18.

References

External links

Neurology journals
Springer Science+Business Media academic journals
Bimonthly journals
Publications established in 1979
English-language journals